Procuring  may refer to:
 Procurement, a business process to acquire goods or services
 Procuring (prostitution), the act of aiding a prostitute in the arrangement of a sex act with a customer

See also
 Procuration